Edward Ross Ritvo (June 1, 1930 – June 10, 2020) was an American psychiatrist known for his research on genetic components of autism. He was a professor emeritus of UCLA's Neuropsychiatric Institute.

Family life and education
Edward Ross Ritvo, son of Max Ritvo and Frances (née Davis) Ritvo, was born in Boston on June 1, 1930. As a young man he enjoyed rowing, skied on Harvard's ski team, and once climbed Mount Blanc. He earned a B.A. in Social Anthropology at Harvard University in 1951, an M.D. from Boston University School of Medicine in 1955, and he completed his internship at Massachusetts Memorial Hospitals in1956, as well as a psychiatry residency at Massachusetts Mental Health Center from 1956–1958. He had seven children including Eva Ritvo and Max Ritvo.

Career
Ritvo held positions as a teaching fellow in psychiatry at Harvard Medical School, Tufts Medical School, and a fellowship in child psychiatry at James Jackson Putnam Children’s Center in Boston.

Drafted into the U.S. Army Medical Corps, he was the Chief of the Closed Neuropsychiatric Section at the Brooke Army Medical Center in Sam Houston, Texas, from 1958–1961. He self-published his experiences there in Drafted and Shafted: Memoirs of an Army Psychiatrist.

Following a fellowship in child psychiatry at Reiss-Davis Clinic for Child Psychiatry, in Los Angeles from 1961–1962, he joined the faculty of the UCLA School of Medicine in 1962, where he served until he retired as professor emeritus.

He was one of the psychiatrists who wrote the original definition of autism for the Diagnostic and Statistical Manual of Mental Disorders.

Ritvo led a 1985 study of 61 pairs of twins which showed "that autism is associated with an inherited gene, and that the pattern of inheritance is recessive." He and colleagues at UCLA identified a subclinical form of autism in the parents of autistic children.

Selected publications

Professional books

Journal articles 

 1980 Freeman, B.J., and Ritvo, E.R. The Behavior Observation Scale for Autism (BOS).  Invited paper.  Int. J. Rehabil. Res. 3:254-346, 1980.
 Ritvo, E.R. and Ritvo, E.C. Genetic and immuno-hematologic factors in autism.  Biological Psychiatry 1981, Proceedings of the Third World Congress of Biological Psychiatry held June 28–July 3, 1981, Stockholm, Sweden.
 
 Freeman, B.J., Ritvo, E.R., Yokota, A. Pingree, C. Mason-Brothers, A., Mo., A., Jenson W.P., Peterson, B. McMahan, W.  Autism, Forme Fruste: Psychometric assessments of first-degree relatives.  In C. Shagass, et al. (Eds.), Biological Psychiatry 1985, New York: Elsevier Science Publishing Co., Inc. 1986.

Popular media

Awards 

 Lifetime Achievement Award, International Society for Autism Research, 2010, "acknowledges an individual who has made significant fundamental contributions to research on autism spectrum disorders that have had a lasting impact on the field."
 American Academy of Child and Adolescent Psychiatry, George Tarjan Award, 1994, for a life-time of contributions to the understanding of MR and Developmental Disabilities.
 American Psychiatric Association, Blanche F. Ittleson Award, 1990, in recognition of scientific contributions to child psychiatry.
 Southern California Psychiatric Society Achievement Award for Distinguished Research, April 23, 1988.
 Autism Society of America "Man of the Year" Award, March 6, 1988.
 The National Society of Autistic Children Annual Award for Scientific Achievement, June 28, 1974.

See also

 Asperger syndrome
 Autism spectrum
 Autism spectrum disorders in the media

References

1930 births
2020 deaths
American psychiatrists
David Geffen School of Medicine at UCLA faculty
Boston University School of Medicine alumni
Harvard College alumni
Autism researchers
Autism in the United States